The Mitragliatrice Breda calibro 8 modello 37 (commonly known as the Breda mod. 37 or simply Breda 37) was an Italian Medium machine gun produced by Breda and adopted in 1937 by the Royal Italian Army. It was the standard heavy machine gun for the Royal Italian Army during World War II, and continued to be used by the Italian Army after the conflict. The Breda 37 was meant as company/battalion support as compared to the more troublesome Breda 30 meant for squad/platoon support and proved far more effective in combat. Though some sources say that the gun possesses some of the same problematic features of the Breda 30.(mainly the need for an oil reservoir to lubricate the cartridges before chambering), the reality is that the Breda 37 was a simple (only four moving parts) and reliable gun that doesn’t need lubrication and has nothing to do with the previous series (that was mistakenly called the Breda 30 series: in reality, the Breda 30 automatic rifle/light machinegun is part of the Breda 24 series). Instead, the Breda 37 is part of the Breda 31 series of automatic weapons, the series started with the Breda 31 (a licensed built copy of the Hotchkiss 1929): the weapons of this series were amongst the most re-employed by the allies and this weapon continue to serve well after WW2, only being replaced in Portuguese service by the FN MAG in 1960.
The weapon was also adopted for use by the Regia Marina in small numbers aboard minor warships.

Design and operation
The Breda M37 was a gas-operated, air-cooled medium machine gun.  The Breda used a slightly larger cartridge than its rivals, the 8x59mm RB Breda. A common misnomer, the Breda 37 does contain a camming mechanism for initial extraction of the cartridge case after firing, which means that each cartridge does not need to be oiled before being fed into the chamber. There is no provision for a oiler on any variant of the Breda 37, unlike its predecessor, the Breda 30 in 6.5mm carcano.

Another drawback was that the gun was fed by 20-round trays of cartridges.  This limited continuous fire, as the gun could be fired rapidly only when a second crew member fed in one ammunition tray after another (although being air cooled the gun would be unable to fire more than short bursts anyway, or it would rapidly overheat). Another peculiarity of the design is that the spent cases were reinserted in the tray as each round was fired.  The mechanical energy required to perform this function substantially reduced the rate of fire, and the weapon tended to jam whenever a case was reinserted even slightly out of line. It also meant that, in the event the metal clips had to be reused, the gunner's assistant first had to remove the empty cases from the trays. Although, this is a non-issue as the feed tray loading machine removes the empty cases from the trays as it refills them with fresh ammunition.

This design flaw was actually intentional. Recycling cartridge cases for reloading was a common practice in some militaries of the time (admonitions to collect and clean spent cartridges are found on ammunition carton labels). The trays were supposed to be returned with the spent cartridges still inside to ammo supply points. There the trays would be emptied and reloaded and the spent cartridges were reboxed and repacked for reloading. The realities of combat made this idea impractical.

Service use

In service, the Breda 37 and 38 proved to be fairly reliable heavy machine guns.  Perhaps because the heavy support weapons received more attention from their crews, field reports were generally positive except for jams caused by desert sand and dust, which in the Western Desert affected all infantry machine guns to some extent.  The Breda 37's slow rate of fire helped prevent overheating during prolonged fire, and its powerful, heavy-bullet cartridge had excellent range and penetration. Still, this machine gun was almost twice as heavy as the German machine guns and heavier than weapons like the M1919. In fact, it was the heaviest World War II rifle-caliber machine gun, and unnecessarily complex to use and deploy. This was another issue for Italians, whose mobility was limited by their weak truck fleet. The tripod added around 20 kg to the complex, putting it at around 40 kilograms.

In Regia Marina service, the M37 was used aboard vessels from aviso scorta (destroyer escort/torpedo boat) rank, such as the 840-ton Orsa class which carried two per ship as tertiary gun armament, down to small flotilla craft. MS boats frequently carried them as secondary gun armament and many early-war MAS boats carried an M37 as their sole gun armament before the Breda 20mm cannon became available in sufficient numbers. Likewise, the early examples of the VAS anti-submarine launch (Vedetta Antisommergibile) carried a pair of M37s forward in place of the designed 20mm gun, owing to production shortages of the heavier weapon.

The M37 was also adopted by the Portuguese armed forces, who placed it into service as the Metralhadora pesada 7,92 mm m/938 Breda heavy machine gun.  The Breda saw extensive service in Portugal's African colonies during the early stages of the Portuguese Colonial Wars. 

The Breda Modello 38 was intended for vehicle use, and was fed from a top-mounted box magazine.  The Modello 38 used a pistol style grip, rather than the twin firing handles of the Modello 37. This was the main vehicle-mounted machine gun used in fighting vehicles by the Royal Italian Army.

Production ended in 1943. It was still used as a standard machine gun after the war, until it was replaced by more modern machine guns.

Users
  The Breda modello 37 is the only version chambered in 8x59mm RB Breda.  
  Franco's Spain adopted the Breda M37 machinegun chambered in 7.92mm Mauser.
  Portugal's right-wing government adopted the Breda 37 in 7.92mm Mauser as the m/938 Breda not long after Spain did.

References

External links
Comando Supremo: Italy at War

World War II infantry weapons of Italy
World War II machine guns
Heavy machine guns
Machine guns of Italy
Breda weapons
Military equipment introduced in the 1930s